The New Zealand Companies Office (a service of the New Zealand Ministry of Business, Innovation and Employment) is a government agency that provides business registry services in relation to corporate entities, personal property and capital market securities. It delivers nearly all its services through electronic systems and the internet.

Activities
Its registers relate to companies, personal property securities, superannuation funds, incorporated societies, building societies, charitable trusts, unit trusts, friendly societies and credit unions. The office also has compliance, prosecution and enforcement functions under the Companies Act, Securities Act, Corporations (Investigation and Management) Act 1989, Financial Reporting Act along with others.

Electronic register
The Companies Register's website includes an electronic register available to the public 24 hours a day, 7 days a week and provides the online searching, incorporation and maintenance services for New Zealand registered companies or other body corporates.

The Companies Office was the first government corporate registry in the world to allow access over the Internet to statutory corporate information. The site went live in 1996. In 1999 the Companies Office was the first in the world to allow the incorporation of companies over the Internet.

Other registers
The Companies Office is also responsible for the administration of the following registers:
The Societies and Trusts Register.
The Personal Property Securities Register (PPSR) is a fully electronic register where information about security interests in personal property are recorded and searched. The PPSR is available to the public 24 hours a day, 7 days a week.
The Disclose Register - a register for offers of financial products and managed investment schemes under the Financial Markets Conduct Act 2013.
The Financial Service Providers Register - as required under the Financial Services Providers (Registration & Dispute Resolution) Act 2008.
The New Zealand Companies Office is a founding member of the Corporate Registers Forum (an international association of corporate registries) and is an International member of the International Association of Commercial Administrators (IACA).

See also
 List of company registers

References

External links
New Zealand Companies Office Website
Ministry of Business, Innovation and Employment Website

Corporate law
Government agencies of New Zealand
Registrars of companies